Sofie Garrucho is the first FHM Philippines Girl Next Door (2005).  She appeared in the cover of FHM (November 2005) issue. She has signed a contract with Viva and is a current member of the Viva Hot Babes.

Other information
 Cover girl of FHM November 2005.
 She currently has a blog in FHM Philippine Online- SOFIE's FHM BLOG
 She has appearances in other issues of FHM and is listed amongst FHM Philippines 100 sexiest.
 Currently the face of KAI REGENCY SPA  for 2009

Other credits

 FHM Philippines Girls Next Door Contest Grand Winner 2005
 FHM Philippines Cover for Girls Next Door Booklet. Sept. 2005
 FHM Philippines Poster Insert Sept 2005
 FHM Philippines November 2005 Cover Girl
 FHM Philippines Calendar Girl for the month of March 2006
 FHM Philippines top 100 Sexiest Women 2006 (Rank 45th)
 FHM Philippines May 2007 Issue
 FHM Philippines top 100Sexiest Women 2007 (Rank 88th)
 FHM Philippines top 100sexiest Women 2008 (Rank 92nd)
 FHM Singapore - FHM Singapore's "Global Girl Next door" 2007 issue
 ASIA SPA Magazine - Sept/Oct 2008 - Ad for KAI REGENCY SPA Spa
 LA ISLA MAGAZINE - Air Philippines Inflight magazine Ad for KAI REGENCY SPA

Filmography

Movies
 Skin City
 Fashion TV Asia : Asian Inspired Shoot with Photographer Sao Esquillon
 Fashion TV Asia : Midnight Hot
 When Timawa meets Delgado

TV guestings
 Eat Bulaga!
 Quizon Ave. (Defunct Comedy Show)
 Men's Room (Defunct STudio 23 TV show)

References

People from Guimaras
Actresses from Iloilo
Filipino female models
Filipino film actresses
Filipino television actresses
Living people
Year of birth missing (living people)